Brooke Lochland (born 3 May 1991) is an Australian rules footballer and former speed skater. Lochland currently plays for the Sydney Swans in the AFL Women's (AFLW), having previously played for the Western Bulldogs from 2017 to 2022. In 2018, she played in the Bulldogs' AFL Women's premiership team, was the AFL Women's leading goalkicker for that season and was named in the 2018 AFL Women's All-Australian team.

Early life 
Lochland took up inline skating at age four and competed in world championships as a teenager. At age 16, she moved to the Netherlands to pursue a career as a long track speed skater. Despite finishing sixth in the 2011–12 World Cup mass start event, she missed out on qualifying for the Sochi Winter Olympics and retired from the sport in 2014. Upon returning to Australia later that year, Lochland switched back to football, having previously played as a junior. After two impressive seasons with Montmorency, highlighted by winning the best and fairest award for Division Two of the Victorian Women's Football League in 2015, she joined Melbourne University in the VFL Women's competition for the 2016 season.

AFL Women's career 
Lochland was drafted by the Western Bulldogs with their seventh selection and 53rd overall in the 2016 AFL Women's draft. She made her debut in the 32-point win against  at VU Whitten Oval in the opening round of the 2017 season. She played every match in her debut season to finish with seven games.

She finished the home-and-away season with twelve goals from seven matches, clinching the AFLW leading goalkicker award for the year. She would share in team success when the Western Bulldogs went on to win the premiership by defeating  in the Grand Final at Ikon Park, as well as gaining more individual recognition via selection in the All-Australian team.

Lochland sustained a leg injury in a 2019 practice match against  and subsequently underwent surgery to repair her fractured right fibula.

Ahead of the 2020 season, Lochland was appointed vice-captain of the Western Bulldogs. She regained consistent form throughout the 2021 season, playing every game possible and managing a career-high sixth-place finish in the club's best and fairest count (eclipsing her seventh-place finish in 2018). She finished the season strongly, however, most notably in a 60-point round nine win against  at Optus Stadium by gathering 15 disposals, laying five tackles and kicking three goals—her biggest haul since the record-breaking performance in 2018.

In May 2022, in a signing reported on womens.afl as a "long-awaited coup for one of the competition's new teams", Lochland joined expansion club Sydney.

Statistics
Updated to the end of S7 (2022).

|-
| 2017 ||  || 1
| 7 || 1 || 2 || 47 || 17 || 64 || 7 || 32 || 0.1 || 0.3 || 6.7 || 2.4 || 9.1 || 1.0 || 4.6 || 0
|-
| bgcolor=F0E68C | 2018# ||  || 1
| 8 || bgcolor=CAE1FF | 12† || 6 || 74 || 22 || 96 || bgcolor=CAE1FF | 34† || 25 || bgcolor=CAE1FF |1.5† || 0.8 || 9.3 || 2.8 || 12.0 || 4.3 || 3.1 || 3
|-
| 2019 ||  || 1
| 3 || 1 || 2 || 14 || 5 || 19 || 4 || 9 || 0.3 || 0.7 || 4.7 || 1.7 || 6.3 || 1.3 || 3.0 || 0
|- 
| 2020 ||  || 1
| 2 || 0 || 0 || 16 || 7 || 23 || 5 || 5 || 0.0 || 0.0 || 8.0 || 3.5 || 11.5 || 2.5 || 2.5 || 0
|-
| 2021 ||  || 1
| 9 || 1 || 1 || 87 || 40 || 127 || 28 || 27 || 0.1 || 0.1 || 9.7 || 4.4 || 14.1 || 3.1 || 3.0 || 2
|- 
| 2022 ||  || 1
| 6 || 3 || 4 || 38 || 17 || 55 || 16 || 11 || 0.5 || 0.7 || 6.3 || 2.8 || 9.2 || 2.7 || 1.8 || 2
|- 
| S7 (2022) ||  || 1
| 10 || 7 || 1 || 62 || 32 || 94 || 19 || 29 || 0.7 || 0.1 || 6.2 || 3.2 || 9.4 || 1.9 || 2.9 || 3
|- class=sortbottom
! colspan=3 | Career
! 45 !! 25 !! 16 !! 338 !! 140 !! 478 !! 113 !! 138 !! 0.6 !! 0.4 !! 7.5 !! 3.1 !! 10.6 !! 2.5 !! 3.1 !! 10
|}

Honours and achievements
Team
 AFL Women's premiership player: 2018
 AFL Women's minor premiership: 2018

Individual
 Sydney co-captain: S7 (2022)–present
 Sydney equal games record holder
 Sydney equal goalkicking record holder
 AFL Women's leading goalkicker: 2018
 AFL Women's All-Australian team: 2018
 Western Bulldogs leading goalkicker: 2018
 Sydney leading goalkicker: S7

References

External links

 
 
 

1991 births
Living people
Western Bulldogs (AFLW) players
Australian rules footballers from Victoria (Australia)
All-Australians (AFL Women's)
Australian female speed skaters
Inline speed skaters
Melbourne University Football Club (VFLW) players
Sydney Swans (AFLW) players